Finland participated in the Eurovision Song Contest 1996 with the song "Niin kaunis on taivas" written by Timo Niemi. The song was performed by the singer 
Jasmine. The Finnish broadcaster Yleisradio (Yle) returned to the Eurovision Song Contest after a one-year absence following their relegation from 1995 as one of the bottom nine countries in the 1994 contest. Yle organised the national final Euroviisut 1996 - Euroviisut ja Emma in order to select the Finnish entry for the 1996 contest in Oslo, Norway. Ten entries selected to compete in the national final were presented on 3 February 1996 and votes from the public selected "Niin kaunis on taivas" performed by Jasmine as the winner with 67,907 votes, which was announced during a televised programme on 5 February 1996.

Finland was announced among the top 22 entries of the qualifying round on 20 and 21 March 1996 and therefore qualified to compete in the final which took place on 18 May 1996. It was later revealed that Finland placed twenty-second out of the 29 participating countries in the qualifying round with 26 points. Performing during the competition in position 18, Finland placed twenty-third (last) out of the 23 participating countries, scoring 9 points.

Background 

Prior to the 1996 contest, Finland had participated in the Eurovision Song Contest thirty-three times since its first entry in 1961. Finland's best result in the contest achieved in 1973 where the song "Tom Tom Tom" performed by Marion Rung placed sixth. The Finnish national broadcaster, Yleisradio (Yle), broadcasts the event within Finland and organises the selection process for the nation's entry. Finland's entries for the Eurovision Song Contest have been selected through national final competitions that have varied in format over the years. Since 1961, a selection show that was often titled Euroviisukarsinta highlighted that the purpose of the program was to select a song for Eurovision. The broadcaster selected the Finnish entry for the 1996 contest again through the Euroviisut selection show.

Before Eurovision

Euroviisut 1996 - Euroviisut ja Emma 
Euroviisut 1996 - Euroviisut ja Emma was the national final that selected Finland's entry for the Eurovision Song Contest 1996. The competition consisted of a final on 3 February 1996, held at the Espoo Cultural Centre in Espoo during the annual Emma-gaala awards show on Yle TV1 and hosted by Finnish presenter Minna Pentti and Finnish scripwriter/journalist Nina Honkanen. Ten entries selected for the competition from 70 submissions received from record companies competed and the winner was selected based on the results from a public vote, which were revealed by Finland's five telephone regions along with the votes of the venue audience. Among the competing artists was former Finnish Eurovision entrant Kirka who represented Finland in 1984. Due to a technical failure of the telephone system caused by an unexpectedly large number of votes being cast, the voting was extended until 5 February 1996 and "Niin kaunis on taivas" performed by Jasmine was announced as the winner during a televised programme on the same day. 219,034 votes were cast in the national final, which was watched by 1.2 million viewers in Finland.

At Eurovision 
In 1996, all nations with the exceptions of the host country were required to qualify from an audio qualifying round, held on 20 and 21 March 1996, in order to compete for the Eurovision Song Contest; the top twenty-two countries from the qualifying round progress to the contest. During a special allocation draw which determined the running order of the final on 22 March 1996, Finland was announced as having finished in the top 22 and subsequently qualifying for the contest. It was later revealed that Finland placed twenty-second in the qualifying round, receiving a total of 26 points. Following the draw, Finland was set to perform in position 18, following the entry from Ireland and before the entry from Iceland. The Finnish conductor at the contest was Olli Ahvenlahti, and Finland finished in twenty-third (last) place with 9 points. This was the eighth time Finland finished in last place at the Eurovision Song Contest.

Jasmine's appearance on stage with unstyled hair and no make-up (in contrast to her groomed appearance at the national final) caused considerable puzzled comment – she would subsequently explain that she had strongly disliked the results of the Norwegian hairstyling and make-up artists endeavours, and at the last minute had decided to wash out her hair and remove the make-up, but had no time to start again herself so had no choice but to appear on stage au naturel.

The final was televised in Finland on Yle TV1 with commentary by Erkki Pohjanheimo, Sanna Kojo and Minna Pentti as well as via radio with commentary by Iris Mattila and Pasi Hiihtola on Yle Radio Suomi. The Finnish spokesperson, who announced the Finnish votes during the final, was Solveig Herlin.

Voting 
Below is a breakdown of points awarded to Finland and awarded by Finland in the qualifying round and the final. The nation awarded its 12 points to Sweden in the qualifying round and to Estonia in the final. Among the members of the Finnish jury in the final was singer and musician Maarit Hurmerinta.

Qualifying round

Final

References

External links
 Full national final on Yle Elävä Arkisto

1996
Countries in the Eurovision Song Contest 1996
Eurovision